Yadlamalka is a rural locality in the Far North region of South Australia. Yadlamalka lies at the southern tip of Lake Torrens within the Pastoral Unincorporated Area, 60 kilometres north of  Port Augusta.

The area is an arid plain between the Flinders Ranges and Lake Torrens, and exhibits some salt flats.

References

Towns in South Australia
Far North (South Australia)
Places in the unincorporated areas of South Australia